Beat Cinema is a weekly experimental hip hop, dance, and electronic music club night that takes place every Wednesday since 2009 in Los Angeles, California. Alongside their weekly events, the event is also thrown one-off special events such as Boat Parties, Barbecues, and club takeovers as far south as san diego. They also hold an annual Beat Battle with various industry sponsors and cash prizes. Since 2013 they have hosted an ambient takeover tent at coachella called "the turn down". at first having started in the inland empire they relocated to central Los Angeles, running in competition with the renowned Low End Theory.

They have had both burgeoning and renowned artists performing there such as Open Mike Eagle, JPEGMafia, Tokimonsta, Mndsgn, Eureka The Butcher, Free The Robots, Dj Nobody, Dibiase, Daedelus, Ras G, to name a few.

A virtual reality documentary about Beat Cinema, Do What You Love: The L.A. Underground Beat Scene premiered at The LA Weekly Artopia on Aug. 26 2017. Those at the event, held at Union Station, were able to watch the short film on headsets with Beat Cinema residents.

In the wake of Low End Theories Retirement, Beat Cinema, along with others, have filled the void of the Los Angeles Beat Scene. The Event has been described by Daedelus “Inadvertently or on purpose, they’re the future,” he says. “They’re next up.”

Current Residents

Rick G

wave Groove

Dropdead

Deevo

Coby

MsMMMsG

Etta

Demonslayer

Jerms

Arti

DeathPxnch

SSWIII

Major Gape

References

Club nights